The following is a list of annual festivals in the province of Saskatchewan, Canada.

List of festivals

Battlefords Region
North Battleford International Street Performer Festival

Kindersley region
Goose Festival
Rosetown & District Harvest Family Festival, Rosetown
Wild West Daze, Leader

Lloydminster region
Arts Without Borders Festival
The Dog Patch Music Festival, Whelan
Lloydfest
Macklin World Bunnock Championship Challenge, Macklin
St. Walburg Wild Blueberry Festival, St. Walburg

Moose Jaw region
Moose Jaw Band & Choral Festival
Moose Jaw Gaming Expo
Moose Jaw Music Festival
Moose Jaw Sidewalk Days Festival
Motif Moose Jaw Multicultural Festival
Old Wives Lake Festival, Mossbank
Sandy Creek Gospel Jamboree, Besant Park and Campground, Mortlach
Saskatchewan Festival of Words
Saskatchewan yesssssiiiitMusic Festival
Saskatoon Berry Festival, Mortlach
Summer Solstice d'ete Festival, Gravelbourg
Threshing Bee

Northern Saskatchewan
Churchill River Whitewater Festival

Prince Albert region
Art Fest Waskesiu, Waskesiu
Backwardsness 
Canadian Challenge International Sled Dog Race 
Chester Fest
Country at the Creek, Ness Creek
Downtown Street Fair
Electric Sky Electronic Music and Arts Festival, Ness Creek
Elysium Music & Arts Festival
Farm Fair
FiddlyNess
forestART
Higher Ground Music and Arts Festival, Struthers Lake
James Smith Annual Pow Wow - James Smith Cree Nation; first weekend of August
June Bug Days
Kiwanis Music Festival
Louis Riel Relay & Kidfest, Batoche National Historic Site
Metis Fall Festival - three-day festival honoring Métis Heritage; held in September
Muskoday Pow Wow - Muskoday First Nations; held in August
Muskoday Rodeo & Chuckwagon Races - Muskoday First Nations; held in June
Napatak Ramble
Ness Creek Music Festival
Northern Lights Bluegrass and Old Time Festival, Ness Creek
PAGC Fine Arts Festival
Prince Albert Exhibition & Summer Fair
Prince Albert Polka Fest
Prince Albert Winter Festival
Pumpkin Music Festival
Solstice on the South Saskatchewan, One Arrow First Nations - multi-genre music, art, and culture festival
Sturgeon Lake Pow Wow - Sturgeon Lake First Nations; held in July
Thanksgiving Annual International Pow Wow
Three Island Paddle & Music Festival, Hanging Hearts Lake
Vintage Power Machines Threshing Festival - annual festival that showcases antique farm machinery, demonstrations, and more.
Waskesiu Children's Festival
Waskesiu Festival - Waskesiu; National Park; held in July
Waskesiu Lakeside Festival

Regina region

The 5K Foam Fest
Beer Bacon Bands
Cathedral Village Arts Festival
Connect Music Festival
Craven Country Jamboree/Country Thunder
Downtowner's Optimist Music Festival
Fan Expo Regina
FNUniv Spring Pow Wow
Fort Qu'Appelle Midsummer Arts Festival
The Great Saskatchewan Mustard Festival
JazzFest Regina
Kiwanis Music Festival
KōnaFest
Mid-Winter Ceilidh
Mid-Winter Blues Festival
Middle Years Drama Festival
Mosaic - A Festival of Cultures
Noise Fest Regina
Queen City AniFest
Queen City Ex
Queen City Pride
Queer City Cinema
ReginaCadabra Magic Festival
Regina Dragon Boat Festival
Regina Folk Festival
Regina International Film Festival and Awards
Regina International Fringe Theatre Festival
Regina Pickle-fest
The Regina Strength Festival
Rotary Carol Festival
Sask Soul Fest
Saskatchewan Fashion Week
Saskatchewan Highland Gathering & Celtic Festival
Shake the Lake Outdoor Music Festival
Summer Invasion
Swamp Fest
Symphony Under the Sky Festival, Motherwell Homestead National Historic Site, Abernathy
TheatreFest

Saskatoon region

Borealis Flamenco Festival
Draggins Annual Rod & Custom Car Show 
Eagle Creek Jamboree, Eagle Creek Regional Park
Enchanted Forest
FolkFest
Food Truck Wars
Gladiola Festival
Great Plains Comedy Fest
Heritage Festival of Saskatoon
John Arcand Fiddle Festival
MazzFest
Manitou Music Fest, Manitou Beach
NatureCity Festival
Northern Saskatchewan Games and Cultural Festival
Northern Saskatchewan International Children's Festival
Nuit Blanche 
Nutrien Children's Festival of Saskatchewan
Perogyfest Music Festival, Martensville, 
Phantasm Festival
Pickers' Cup: Saskatchewan's Original Tournival
PotashCorp Fireworks Festival
PotashCorp Wintershines Festival
Pumpkin Festival
RibFest
Ritornello Chamber Music Festival
River Lights Festival
Rock on the River - Coincides with Show & Shine Weekend
Rockridge Gospel Music Festival
Saskatchewan Music Festival
Saskatoon Blues Festival
Saskatoon Dragon Boat Festival
Saskatoon Ex
Saskatoon Fantastic Film Festival
Saskatoon Fringe Theatre Festival
Saskatoon Maker Faire
Saskatoon Polkafest
Saskatoon Pride
Saskatoon Reggae and World Music Festival
Sasktel Saskatchewan Jazz Fest
Shakespeare on the Saskatchewan
Show & Shine Weekend - Coincides with Rock on the River
Strata Festival
Taste of Saskatchewan
The Word on the Street
Top of the Hops: Grapes and Grains Festival
Vesna Festival
Winter FunFest, Martensville
Winter Shines
Winterruption

Swift Current region
Boomtown Days & Stampede, Shaunavon
Chautauqua Theatre Festival
Cowboy Poetry Gathering, Maple Creek
Dino Days, Eastend
Frenchman River Gospel Jam, Shaunavon
Frontier Days Fair & Rodeo
Long Day's Night Music Festival
Maple Creek Heritage Festival, Maple Creek
Southwest Quest for Saskatchewan Art and History
Taste of Maple Creek, Maple Creek
Saskpower Windscape Kite Festival

Various locations
Provincial Snowmobile Festival

Weyburn region
All Folk'd Up Music Festival, Kemoca Regional Park, Montmartre

Yorkton region
Winter Lights Festival, Canora
Threshermen's Show and Seniors' Festival
Veselka, Foam Lake
Yorkton Film Festival

See also

List of festivals in Canada  
Culture of Saskatchewan
Tourism in Saskatchewan

References

Festivals
Saskatchewan
Saskatchewan